Three Stories may refer to:

 "Three Stories" (House), an episode of the TV series House
 Three Stories (1997 film), a Russian-Ukrainian comedy film
 Three Stories (1953 film), a Polish drama film